The 2005–06 Divizia B was the 66th season of the second tier of the Romanian football league system.

The format has been maintained to three series, each of them consisting of 16 teams. At the end of the season, the winners of the series promoted to Divizia A and the last six places from all the series relegated to Divizia C. A promotion play-off was played between the runners-up of the Divizia B series to decide the fourth promoted team. A special ranking was made between the 10th place teams of every series and the team with the worst ranking in this standing was relegated, as well. These changes in promotion and relegation rules were made because starting with the next season, Romanian football league system was reformed.

Team changes

To Divizia B
Promoted from Divizia C
 Cetatea Suceava
 Portul Constanța
 Dunărea Giurgiu
 Poiana Câmpina
 Râmnicu Vâlcea
 CFR Timișoara
 Minerul Lupeni
 Forex Brașov
 Gloria II Bistrița
 FCM Reșița**

Relegated from Divizia A
 Apulum Alba Iulia
 FC Brașov
 FC U Craiova

From Divizia B
Relegated to Divizia C
 Tricotaje Ineu**
 Internațional Pitești**
 Deva**
 Ghimbav
 Building Vânju Mare
 Oașul Negrești
 Unirea Focșani
 Oltul Slatina
 ACU Arad
 Politehnica Timișoara
 Rulmentul Alexandria
 Corvinul Hunedoara

Promoted to Divizia A
 FC Vaslui
 Pandurii Târgu Jiu
 Jiul Petroșani

Note (**)
Tricotaje Ineu sold its Divizia B place to FCM Reșița.

Internațional Pitești sold its Divizia B place to Astra Ploiești, club which split from Petrolul Ploiești, after only one season since their merge.

CS Deva sold its Divizia B place to Corvinul 2005 Hunedoara, an unofficial successor of Corvinul Hunedoara, club which was dissolved at the end of the previous season.

Renamed teams
Altay Constanța was moved from Constanța to Medgidia and renamed as Altay Medgidia.

FC Oradea was renamed as Bihor Oradea.

CSM Reșița split from the merge with FC U Craiova, which second team was in the last season of the third tier and was renamed as FCM Reșița.

League tables

Seria I

Seria II

Seria III

Promotion play-off
In the following season, the Liga I was expanded from 16 teams to 18 teams, therefore the Romanian Football Federation decided that a promotion playoff group would be played at the end of the season, between the second placed teams from each series of the Liga II, in order to establish the fourth promoted team (in exchange to the two teams relegated from the Liga I). The winner of this group, Unirea Urziceni, promoted to the Liga I, along with the three winners of the series.

Possible relegation
At the end of the season, a special table was made between 10th places from the 3 series. The last team in this table was also relegated in the Liga III. In this table, 10th place teams are included without the points obtained against teams that relegated in their series.

Top scorers
18 goals
  Tiberiu Șerban (Ceahlăul Piatra Neamț)

14 goals
  Dorel Zaharia (Unirea Urziceni)

8 goals
  Dumitru Gheorghe (Unirea Urziceni)
  Lucian Itu (Minerul Lupeni)
  János Székely (Universitatea Cluj)

7 goals
  Claudiu Boaru (Gaz Metan Mediaș)

5 goals
  Claudiu Ionescu (Dacia Mioveni)
  Radu Neguț (FC Sibiu)

4 goals
  Mircea Bornescu (FC U Craiova)
  Laurențiu Buș (Universitatea Cluj)
  Daniel Stan (Bihor Oradea)

See also
2005–06 Divizia A

References

Liga II seasons
Rom
2005–06 in Romanian football